Clarence W. Hausner (May 31, 1862 – December 29, 1942) was an American farmer and politician from New York.

Life 
Hausner was born on May 31, 1862 in Ulysses, New York, the son of Irving Hausner and Ruth Smith.

Hausner lived on the Agard farm in North Settlement for 11 years, then moved to Odessa. He was a director and vice-president of the First National Bank of Odessa after it opened in 1930. He became a prominent farmer in the area. He served as a member of the Montour town board, chairman of the board of education, president of the Schuyler County sheep breeder's association, and secretary and treasurer of the farm bureau. He was a member of the Grange since he was 21.

In 1919, Hausner was elected to the New York State Assembly as a Republican, representing Schuyler County. He served in the Assembly in 1920, 1921, and 1922.

In 1888, Hausner married Florence Smith. Their children were Mrs. Ethel Lattin, Harold, Kenneth, and Edna. He was a vestryman of St. John's Episcopal Church. He was a member of the Independent Order of Odd Fellows.

Hausner died on December 29, 1942. He was buried in Laurel Hill Cemetery.

References

External links 

 The Political Graveyard
 Clarence W. Hausner at Find a Grave

1862 births
1942 deaths
People from Schuyler County, New York
Farmers from New York (state)
School board members in New York (state)
20th-century American politicians
Republican Party members of the New York State Assembly
20th-century American Episcopalians
Burials in New York (state)